Kabhi Aisa Lagta Hai is the fourth solo album by Indian singer Lucky Ali.  After delivering hits like "O Sanam", "Dekha Hai Aise Bhi", and "Tere Mere Saath", the soulful singer tried something different in its title track. Quite unlike his usual style, this album is more experimental with different styles.
'Jabse Mili Tumse' is a refreshing composition which talks about the innocence and confusion of falling in love.
The song "Teri Yaad Jab Aati Hai" is an assurance that love does not die

Track listing
 Kabhi Aisa Lagta Hai कभी ऐसा लगता है کبھی ایسا لگتا ہے
 Teri Yaad Jab Aati Hai तेरी याद जब आती है تیری یاد جب آتی ہے
 Jabse Mili Tumse जबसे मिली तुमसे جبسے ملی تمسے
 Tanhaai Mein Basi तन्हाई में बसी تنہائی میں بسی
 Ek Pal Mein Hai एक पल में है ایک پل میں ہے
 Ye Dil Deewana Haiये दिल दीवाना है یہ دل دیوانہ ہے
 Kabhi Aisa Lagta Hai(Instrumental) कभी ऐसा लगता है کبھی ایسا لگتا ہے
 Thappa Thappi Chhuppa Chhuppi थाप्पा थप्पी छुपा छुपी تھپا تھپی چھپا چھپی

See also 
 Lucky Ali discography

References

2004 albums
Lucky Ali albums